Coimbatore International Airport  is an international airport and the primary airport serving the industrial cities of Coimbatore, Erode and Tiruppur in Tamil Nadu, India. It is the 18th-busiest airport in India for passengers handled, 17th-busiest for total aircraft movement and 15th-busiest for cargo handled. It is the second busiest airport in Tamil Nadu in terms of total passenger traffic after Chennai International Airport. The airport is served by five Indian and three foreign carriers providing direct connectivity to nine domestic and three international destinations.

History

The former Prime Minister of India, Manmohan Singh, declared the government's intention to upgrade Coimbatore Airport to international status in a meeting with senior ministers on 6 June 2012, and the Union Cabinet granted it the status of international airport on 2 October 2012.

Infrastructure

In 2010, new domestic and international divisions were added to the already existing common terminal.

The airport has a parking management system with a capacity to accommodate nearly 300 cars. There are two hangars in the airport; one provides housing for the planes of Coimbatore Flying Club, the other provides shelter for private carriers.

The Airports Authority of India (AAI) has proposed to construct a new domestic departure terminal building with swankier interiors on the eastern side of the airport. Tender process for environmental clearance has started for the construction of the new terminal building and associated works, such as the construction of new Air Traffic Control (ATC) tower cum Technical Block and Admin Block.

Airlines and destinations

Passenger

Cargo

Statistics

Connectivity
Frequent bus services are available from Gandhipuram central bus station and also from other auxiliary bus stations at Singanallur and Ukkadam. Cab services, call taxis and auto rickshaws provide 24 hours commuting services to the airport.

Incidents
 On 13 December 1950, a Douglas DC-3 (registered VT-CFK) of Air India carrying 17 passengers and four crew from Bombay to Coimbatore, crashed into high ground near Kotagiri due to a navigational error, killing all on board.

See also
 Sulur Air Force Station
 List of airports in India

References

External links

Details of Coimbatore airport on AAI website

Airports in Tamil Nadu
International airports in India
Transport in Coimbatore
Buildings and structures in Coimbatore
1940 establishments in India